30th parallel may refer to:

30th parallel north, a circle of latitude in the Northern Hemisphere
30th parallel south, a circle of latitude in the Southern Hemisphere